The 2015–16 Omaha Mavericks men's basketball team represented the University of Nebraska Omaha during the 2015–16 NCAA Division I men's basketball season. The Mavericks, led by 11th year head coach Derrin Hansen, played their home games at Baxter Arena and were members of The Summit League. They finished the season 18–14, 10–6 in Summit League play to finish in third place. They lost in the quarterfinals of The Summit League tournament to Denver. They were invited to the College Basketball Invitational where they lost in the first round to Duquesne.

Roster

Schedule

|-
!colspan=9 style="background:#000000; color:#D71920;"| Tour of Italy

|-
!colspan=9 style="background:#000000; color:#D71920;"| Regular season

|-
!colspan=9 style="background:#000000; color:#D71920;"| The Summit League tournament

|-
!colspan=9 style="background:#000000; color:#D71920;"| CBI

References

Omaha Mavericks men's basketball seasons
Omaha
Omaha
2015 in sports in Nebraska
2016 in sports in Nebraska